Kvarte is a village within the municipality of Perušić in Lika-Senj County, Croatia, population 193 (2011 census).

References

Populated places in Lika-Senj County